Shyam Singh may refer to:
Shyam Singha Roy
Shyam Singh Shashi
Shyam Singh Yadav
Shyam Singh (politician)